Pead is an English surname. Notable people with this surname include:

 Craig Pead (born 1981), English football player
 Dustin Pead (born 1972), American lawyer
 Greg Pead, real name of Yahoo Serious
 Isaiah Pead (born 1989), American football player
 Jim Pead OBE (1924–2009), Australian politician
 Rod Pead, editor of Christian Order

See also
PEAD (disambiguation)